Hibbertia pilosa, commonly known as hairy guinea flower, is a species of flowering plant in the family Dilleniaceae and is endemic to the southwest of Western Australia. The flowers are yellow with one or two densely hairy carpels from September to December. The species was first formally described in 1845 by Ernst Gottlieb von Steudel in Lehmann's Plantae Preissianae. The specific epithet (pilosa) means "pilose", referring to the leaves.

Hairy guinea flower grows on rocky slope, grantie outcrops and hills in the Jarrah Forest and Swan Coastal Plain and Warren bioregions of south-western Western Australia.

See also
List of Hibbertia species

References

pilosa
Flora of Western Australia
Plants described in 1845
Taxa named by Ernst Gottlieb von Steudel